Orion Corporation is a South Korean confectionery company, headquartered in Munbae-dong, Yongsan District, Seoul. The company is one of the three largest food companies in South Korea, and was established in 1956 as Tongyang Confectionery Corp. Orion has manufacturing facilities in Seoul, Cheonan Chungcheongnam-do and cities in China, Russia, Vietnam, India and the United States. Products produced by Orion include biscuits, cookies, crackers, pies, gum, snacks, chocolate, and candy; and its most famous product is Choco Pie. Its competitors include Crown Confectionery and Lotte Confectionery. Orion was the parent company of the entertainment company On-Media, until its acquisition by the CJ Group in 2010.

The company began offering the Choco Pie in 1974. By 2006 it had two thirds of the Chinese cookie market.

Orion maintains a "Choco Pie Index" created as a parody of The Economist's Big Mac Index.

See also 

Economy of South Korea
List of South Korean corporations

References

External links 
Orion Corporation Homepage
Orion Corporation Homepage (in Korean)

Orion Group
Confectionery companies of South Korea
Food and drink companies established in 1956
Manufacturing companies based in Seoul
Companies listed on the Korea Exchange
South Korean brands
South Korean companies established in 1956